Hvalur hf. is an Icelandic commercial whaling and holding company. Hvalur hf. was founded in 1947 as a commercial whaling company by Loftur Bjarnason and Vilhjálmur Árnason and later run by their sons, Kristján Loftsson and Árni Vilhjálmsson. In the recent decades, it has become one of the most powerful investment company in Iceland, having owned large shares in Arion Bank, Marel, Origo hf. and Brim hf. amongst others.

In 1948, the company purchased an American naval base at Hvalfjörður (Whale Fjord) and converted it into a whaling station. Norwegian crews were involved in training Icelandic whalers into the early 1950s.

Whaling fleet
The company currently operates two whaling ships, Hvalur 8 and Hvalur 9. It further owns two more, Hvalur 6 and Hvalur 7, that where never fully repaired following the 1986 Hvalur sinkings.

Ships history
Hvalur 1 Arrived in 1949.
Hvalur 2 - Sold to Síldarverksmiðjur Ríkisins in 1962 and moved to Seyðisfjörður where its steam engine was used to produce steam for at herring smelt factory.
Hvalur 3 - Sold to Síldarverksmiðjur Ríkisins in 1962 and moved to Seyðisfjörður where its steam engine was used to produce steam for at herring smelt factory.
Hvalur 4
Hvalur 5 - Bought in 1955 and sold to Faroe Island in 1968. On display in the German Maritime Museum in Bremerhaven, Germany.
Hvalur 6 - Arrived in 1961. Currently in storage as of 2022.
Hvalur 7 - Arrived in 1961. Currently in storage as of 2022.
Hvalur 8 - Acquired in 1962. In active use as of 2022.
Hvalur 9 - Acquired in 1966. In active use as of 2022.

References

Companies based in Reykjavík
Companies established in 1947
Holding companies of Iceland